Sanchezia lampra is a species of plant in the family Acanthaceae. It is endemic to Ecuador.  Its natural habitat is subtropical or tropical dry forests. It is threatened by habitat loss.

References

Flora of Ecuador
lampra
Critically endangered plants
Taxonomy articles created by Polbot